Reino Nyyssönen (12 February 1935 – January 2023) was a Finnish tennis player.

Nyyssönen is a native of Turku but it was in Sweden that he took up the sport of tennis, after coming to the country as a World War II child evacuee. When he returned to Finland he continued his tennis development in Kotka.

A Davis Cup player for Finland from 1955 to 1964, Nyyssönen won a total of 35 national championships, including six indoor and seven outdoor singles titles. Amongst his best grand slam performances, he made the mixed doubles quarter-finals at the 1961 Wimbledon Championships and the singles fourth round at the 1962 U.S. National Championships.

Nyyssönen was later the national tennis coach for Denmark.

See also
List of Finland Davis Cup team representatives

References

External links
 
 
 

1935 births
2023 deaths
Finnish male tennis players
Sportspeople from Turku